The 2006–07 Serie D was the fifty-ninth edition of the top level Italian non-professional football championship. It represented the fifth tier in the Italian football league system.

The regular season started September 17, 2006 and continued through to May 6, 2007.

Final standings

Legend

Girone A 
Teams from Piedmont, Liguria & Lombardy

Girone B 
Teams from Lombardy & Sardinia

Girone C 
Teams from Trentino-Alto Adige/Südtirol, Veneto &Friuli-Venezia Giulia

Girone D 
Teams from Lombardy, Veneto &Emilia-Romagna

Girone E 
Teams from Liguria, Tuscany & Umbria

Girone F 
Teams from Emilia-Romagna, Marche & Abruzzo

Girone G 
Teams from Umbria, Lazio, Molise &Campania

Girone H 
Teams from Molise, Campania, Apulia &Basilicata

Girone I 
Teams from Campania, Calabria & Sicily

Division winners 
All teams promoted to 2007–08 Serie C2

Scudetto Dilettanti

First round 
 Division winners placed into 3 groups of 3
 Group winners and best second-placed team qualify for semi-finals

Group A

Group B

Group C

Semi-finals 
First leg: May 25; return leg: June 2

Final 
June 9, Città Sant'Angelo

Winners: U.S. Tempio

Promotion playoffs

Rules 
Promotion playoffs involved a total of 36 teams, four for each Serie D group (teams from 2nd to 5th place). The first round is a one-legged match between respectively the second and fifth placed, and the third and fourth placed for each group, and are played at best placed club home field. The two winners for each of these matches are elected to play against each other in the second round, again with home advantage to the club best classified in the regular season. The nine winners are then split in three groups composed by three teams (triangolari). The three group winners and the best runner-up play in the semifinal round. The semifinals are both two-legged, and the respective winners are admitted to play in a one-legged final hosted in a neutral ground. The tournament winner and runner-up are placed at the top of the special list of teams eligible for a repechage, i.e. the admission to Serie C2 in case league vacancies need to be filled.

First round 

 Played on May 13; single-legged matches played at best placed club home field
 2nd-placed team plays 5th-placed team, and 3rd plays 4th in each division

Second round 
 Single-legged matches played at best placed club home field
 One team from each division moves on to third round

Third round 
 Group winners and best second-placed team qualify for semi-finals

Group A

Group B

Group C

Semi-finals 
First leg: June 10; return leg: June 17

Final 
June 24, 2007, Figline Valdarno

Relegations 
Four relegations per division, 17th & 18th placed teams and playoff losers

Direct relegations 

Girone A
 Casteggio Broni (18th)
 Castellettese (17th)

Girone B
 Atletico Calcio (18th)
 Seregno (17th)

Girone C
 Porfido Albiano (18th)
 Pordenone (17th - after tie-breaker)

Girone D
 Cervia (18th)
 Piovese (17th - after tie-breaker)

Girone E
 Forte dei Marmi (18th)
 Sangimignano (17th)

Girone F
 Cattolica (18th)
 Valleverde Riccione (17th)

Girone G
 Civitavecchiese (18th)
 Anziolavinio (17th)

Girone H
 Petacciato (18th)
 Leonessa Altamura (17th)

Girone I
 Paolana (18th)
 Rossanese (17th)

Tie-Breakers 
Played on May 13, 2007

Pordenone & Piovese relegated to Eccellenza, Rivignano and Reno Centese admitted to relegation playoffs

Relegation playoffs 
Played May 20 & 27, 2007
 In case of aggregate tie score, higher classified team wins
 Team highlighted in green saved, the others are relegated to Eccellenza

References

External links 
 2006–07 Serie D at RSSSF

Serie D seasons
5
Italy